Ditmar Bicaj (born 26 February 1989) is an Albanian professional footballer who plays as a defender for Albanian club Bylis Ballsh.

He started his career at Dinamo Tirana, before representing Tirana, Skënderbeu Korçë and Kukësi in Albania, as well as Belasitsa Petrich and Tractor Sazi in Bulgaria and Iran respectively.

Club career

Early career
Bicaj started his career in with his home town club, Dinamo Tirana at a very young age. After some impressive displays in the Albanian Superliga he attracted the attention of foreign clubs, one of those clubs was Belasitsa Petrich in Bulgaria. Bicaj signed a three-year deal with the Bulgarian club in the summer of 2008. The contract should have kept the Albanian at the Tsar Samuil Stadium until 2011. After the club was relegated he moved back to Albania at the champions of the country KF Tirana.

Skënderbeu Korçë
In July 2010, Bicaj signed for Skënderbeu Korçë. He went on to play for four seasons, winning four national championships.

Tractor Sazi
On 14 July 2014, Bicaj joined with Iranian team Tractor Sazi, signing a contract until 2016.

Partizani Tirana
On 9 June 2015, Bicaj returned in Albania and joined Partizani Tirana on a one-year contract. During his presentation, he said that Partizani was the right choice, adding that he would give his best to reach the club's goals.

Vllaznia Shkodër
On 1 August 2016, Bicaj completed a move to Vllaznia Shkodër by signing a one-year deal.

Flamurtari Vlorë
On 6 June 2017, Bicaj joined fellow Albanian Superliga side Flamurtari Vlorë by signing a contract until 2017–18 season. He scored his first goal for the team on 22 October in the matchday 7 of Albanian Superliga, a late header against Kamza at home which brought Flamurtari to winning ways after three consecutive draws. He was on the score-sheet again on 16 November, netting against his old team Skënderbeu Korçë in a 1–1 home win which ended the latter winning streak of 7 consecutive victories. He didn't celebrate as a sign of respect, which initially created confusion among his teammates. He finished the season with 25 league appearances, scoring 3 goals, his highest tally since 2012–13 season, as the team ended up in 6th place. On 31 May 2018, Bicaj confirmed that he will not be playing for Flamurtari in the next season, instead opting for a move outside Albania.

Teuta Durrës
On 30 July 2018, Teuta Durrës announced to have signed Bicaj on a one-year contract, reuniting him with his former teammate Bledi Shkëmbi, now as team manager.

International career
He made his senior debut on 2 June 2010 in Albania's 1–0 defeat of Andorra at Qemal Stafa Stadium, where Bicaj entered as a substitute in the last moments.

Career statistics

Club

International

Honours
Dinamo Tirana
 Albanian Superliga: 2007–08

Skënderbeu Korçë
 Albanian Superliga: 2010–11, 2011–12, 2012–13, 2013–14
 Albanian Supercup: 2013

References

External links
FSHF profile

1989 births
Living people
Footballers from Tirana
Albanian footballers
Association football defenders
Albania youth international footballers
Albania under-21 international footballers
Albania international footballers
FK Dinamo Tirana players
PFC Belasitsa Petrich players
KF Tirana players
KF Skënderbeu Korçë players
Tractor S.C. players
FK Partizani Tirana players
KF Vllaznia Shkodër players
Flamurtari Vlorë players
KF Teuta Durrës players
KF Bylis Ballsh players
Kategoria Superiore players
First Professional Football League (Bulgaria) players
Persian Gulf Pro League players
Albanian expatriate footballers
Expatriate footballers in Bulgaria
Expatriate footballers in Iran
Albanian expatriate sportspeople in Bulgaria
Albanian expatriate sportspeople in Iran